The 2022 Seattle Mariners season was the 46th season in franchise history. The Mariners played their 23rd full season (24th overall) at T-Mobile Park, their home ballpark in Seattle, Washington. The Mariners finished the regular season at 90–72, equaling their record from 2021, and successfully reached the postseason for the first time since 2001.

On December 2, 2021, The Commissioner of Baseball, Rob Manfred announced a lockout of players. This occurred following expiration of the collective bargaining agreement (CBA) between Major League Baseball (MLB) and the Major League Baseball Players Association (MLBPA). On March 10, 2022, the MLB and MLBPA agreed to a new collective bargaining agreement, thus ending the lockout. Opening Day took place on April 8, 2022.  MLB previously announced several series would be cancelled due to the lockout, but the agreement provided a 162-game season, with originally canceled games to be made up via doubleheaders.

On July 17, the Mariners became the first team to enter the All-Star break with a 14-game winning streak, their second longest in club history. For the 21st season in a row, the Mariners failed to win the AL West.

On September 30, Cal Raleigh hit a walk-off home run against the Oakland Athletics, clinching their first playoff berth since 2001. It ended the longest major professional sports postseason drought in North America. They defeated the Toronto Blue Jays in the Wild Card Series, but lost to the eventual champion Houston Astros in the Division Series. The Houston series involved a three-game sweep against the Mariners, complete with an 18-inning loss where they failed to score a single run in their first postseason game played in Seattle since October 18, 2001.

Offseason

Lockout 

The expiration of the league's collective bargaining agreement (CBA) with the Major League Baseball Players Association occurred on December 1, 2021 with no new agreement in place. As a result, the team owners voted unanimously to lockout the players stopping all free agency and trades. 

The parties came to an agreement on a new CBA on March 10, 2022.

Rule changes 
Pursuant to the new CBA, several new rules were instituted for the 2022 season. The National League will adopt the designated hitter full-time, a draft lottery will be implemented, the postseason will expand from ten teams to twelve, and advertising patches will appear on player uniforms and helmets for the first time.

Season standings

American League West

American League Wild Card

Record against opponents

Game log

Regular season

|- style="background:#bfb;"
| 1 || April 8 || @ Twins || 2–1 || Ray (1–0) || Ryan (0–1) || Steckenrider (1) || 35,462 || 1–0 || W1
|- style="background:#bfb;"
| 2 || April 9 || @ Twins || 4–3 || Muñoz (1–0) || Duffey (0–1) || D. Castillo (1) || 20,867 || 2–0 || W2
|- style="background:#fbb;"
| 3 || April 10 || @ Twins || 4–10 || Ober (1–0) || Gonzales (0–1) || — || 17,018 || 2–1 || L1
|- style="background:#fbb;"
| 4 || April 11 || @ Twins || 0–4 || Bundy (1–0) || Flexen (0–1) || — || 12,932 || 2–2 || L2
|- style="background:#fbb;"
| 5 || April 12 || @ White Sox || 2–3 || López (1–0) || Brash (0–1) || Hendriks (1) || 36,948 || 2–3 || L3
|- style="background:#fbb;"
| 6 || April 13 || @ White Sox || 4–6 || Keuchel (1–0) || Ray (1–1) || Hendriks (2) || 12,291 || 2–4 || L4
|- style="background:#bfb;"
| 7 || April 14 || @ White Sox || 5–1 || Gilbert (1–0) || Lambert (0–1) || — || 13,391 || 3–4 || W1
|- style="background:#bfb;"
| 8 || April 15 || Astros || 11–1 || Gonzales (1–1) || Odorizzi (0–1) || — || 45,023 || 4–4 || W2
|- style="background:#fbb;"
| 9 || April 16 || Astros || 0–4 || Verlander (1–1) || Flexen (0–2) || — || 38,504 || 4–5 || L1
|- style="background:#bfb;"
| 10 || April 17 || Astros || 7–2 || Brash (1–1) || Urquidy (1–1) || — || 26,583 || 5–5 || W1
|- style="background:#bfb;"
| 11 || April 19 || Rangers || 6–2 || Ray (2–1) || Gray (0–1) || — || 11,067 || 6–5 || W2
|- style="background:#bfb;"
| 12 || April 20 || Rangers || 4–2 || Gilbert (2–0) || Dunning (0–1) || — || 9,374 || 7–5 || W3
|- style="background:#fbb;"
| 13 || April 21 || Rangers || 6–8 || Barlow (1–0) || Steckenrider (0–1) || — || 12,570 || 7–6 || L1
|- style="background:#bfb;"
| 14 || April 22 || Royals || 4–1 || Flexen (1–2) || Keller (0–2) || Muñoz (1) || 24,206 || 8–6 || W1
|- style="background:#bfb;"
| 15 || April 23 || Royals || 13–7 || D. Castillo (1–0) || Brentz (0–3) || – || 28,583 || 9–6 || W2
|- style="background:#bfb;"
| 16 || April 24 || Royals || 5–4  || Ramírez (1–0) || Payamps (0–1) || – || 28,548 || 10–6 || W3
|- style="background:#bfb;"
| 17 || April 26 || @ Rays || 8–4 || Gilbert (3–0) || Fleming (2–2) || — || 9,257 || 11–6 || W4
|- style="background:#fbb;"
| 18 || April 27 || @ Rays || 2–3 || Rasmussen (1–1) || Gonzales (1–2) || Kittredge (3) || 7,290 || 11–7 || L1
|- style="background:#fbb;"
| 19 || April 28 || @ Rays || 1–2 || Feyereisen (1–0) || Flexen (1–3) || Thompson (2) || 6,749 || 11–8 || L2
|- style="background:#fbb;"
| 20 || April 29 || @ Marlins || 6–8 || Hernández (2–1) || Brash (1–2) || Bender (5) || 9,963 || 11–9 || L3
|- style="background:#fbb;"
| 21 || April 30 || @ Marlins || 1–3 || Luzardo (2–1) || Ray (2–2) || Bender (6) || 29,010 || 11–10 || L4
|-

|- style="background:#bfb;"
| 22 || May 1 || @ Marlins || 7–3 || Gilbert (4–0) || Alcántara (2–1) || – || 16,741 || 12–10 || W1
|- style="background:#fbb;"
| 23 || May 2 || @ Astros || 0–3 || Odorizzi (2–2) || Gonzales (1–3) || Montero (2) || 27,321 || 12–11 || L1
|- style="background:#fbb;"
| 24 || May 3 || @ Astros || 0–4 || Javier (2–0) || Flexen (1–4) || – || 23,796 || 12–12 || L2
|- style="background:#fbb;"
| 25 || May 4 || @ Astros || 2–7 || Verlander (3–1) || Brash (1–3) || – || 24,110 || 12–13 || L3
|- style="background:#fbb;"
| 26 || May 5 || Rays || 3–4 || McClanahan (2–2) || Ray (2–3) || Raley (2) || 17,027 || 12–14 || L4
|- style="background:#fbb;"
| 27 || May 6 || Rays || 7–8 || Thompson (2–1) || Sewald (0–1) || Raley (3) || 26,154 || 12–15 || L5
|- style="background:#fbb;"
| 28 || May 7 || Rays || 2–8 || Rasmussen (3–1) || Gonzales (1–4) || – || 31,589 || 12–16 || L6
|- style="background:#bfb;"
| 29 || May 8 || Rays || 2–1  || Sewald (1–1) || Wisler (1–1) || – || 32,501 || 13–16 || W1
|- style="background:#fbb;"
| 30 || May 9 || Phillies || 0–9 || Suárez (3–1) || Flexen (1–5) || – || 15,881 || 13–17 || L1
|- style="background:#bfb;"
| 31 || May 10 || Phillies || 5–4 || Ray (3–3) || Nola (1–4) || Sewald (1) || 16,422 || 14–17 || W1
|- style="background:#fbb;"
| 32 || May 11 || Phillies || 2–4 || Domínguez (2–1) || Gilbert (4–1) || Knebel (6) || 16,387 || 14–18 || L1
|- style="background:#bfb;"
| 33 || May 13 || @ Mets || 2–1 || Sewald (2–1) || Smith (0–1) || Steckenrider (2) || 36,629 || 15–18 || W1
|- style="background:#fbb;"
| 34 || May 14 || @ Mets || 4–5 || Ottavino (2–1) || Muñoz (1–1) || Díaz (8) || 37,140 || 15–19 || L1
|- style="background:#bfb;"
| 35 || May 15 || @ Mets || 8–7 || Ray (4–3) || Shreve (1–1) || D. Castillo (2) || 38,476 || 16–19 || W1
|- style="background:#fbb;"
| 36 || May 16 || @ Blue Jays || 2–6 || Kikuchi (2–1) || Flexen (1–6) || Cimber (2) || 28,207 || 16–20 || L1
|- style="background:#fbb;"
| 37 || May 17 || @ Blue Jays || 0–3 || Berríos (3–2) || Gilbert (4–2) || Cimber (3) || 22,988 || 16–21 || L2
|- style="background:#bfb;"
| 38 || May 18 || @ Blue Jays || 5–1 || Gonzales (2–4) || Gausman (3–3) || – || 20,472 || 17–21 || W1
|- style="background:#fbb;"
| 39 || May 19 || @ Red Sox || 6–12 || Houck (3–3) || Kirby (0–1) || – || 29,783 || 17–22 || L1
|- style="background:#fbb;"
| 40 || May 20 || @ Red Sox || 3–7 || Davis (1–1) || Ray (4–4) || – || 30,842 || 17–23 || L2
|- style="background:#fbb;"
| 41 || May 21 || @ Red Sox || 5–6 || Schreiber (1–0) || Steckenrider (0–2) || Barnes (2) || 34,832 || 17–24 || L3
|- style="background:#fbb;"
| 42 || May 22 || @ Red Sox || 4–8  || Diekman (1–0) || Muñoz (1–2) || – || 33,896 || 17–25 || L4
|- style="background:#bfb;"
| 43 || May 23 || Athletics || 7–6 || Gonzales (3–4) || Logue (2–3) || Sewald (2) || 14,415 || 18–25 || W1
|- style="background:#fbb;"
| 44 || May 24 || Athletics || 5–7 || Moll (2–0) || Misiewicz (0–1) || Jiménez (9) || 14,797 || 18–26 || L1
|- style="background:#fbb;"
| 45 || May 25 || Athletics || 2–4 || Blackburn (5–0) || Ray (4–5) || Jiménez (10) || 15,856 || 18–27 || L2
|- style="background:#bfb;"
| 46 || May 27 || Astros || 6–1 || Flexen (2–6) || Verlander (6–2) || – || 26,017 || 19–27 || W1
|- style="background:#bfb;"
| 47 || May 28 || Astros || 6–0 || Gilbert (5–2) || Urquidy (4–2) || – || 24,007 || 20–27 || W2
|- style="background:#fbb;"
| 48 || May 29 || Astros || 1–2 || Montero (2–0) || Gonzales (3–5) || Pressly (8) || 28,986 || 20–28 || L1
|- style="background:#bfb;"
| 49 || May 31 || @ Orioles || 10–0 || Kirby (1–1) || Baker (1–3) || – || 8,074 || 21–28 || W1
|-

|- style="background:#fbb;"
| 50 || June 1 || @ Orioles || 2–9 || Pérez (4–0) || Ray (4–6) || – || 8,400 || 21–29 || L1
|- style="background:#bfb;"
| 51 || June 2 || @ Orioles || 7–6  || D. Castillo (2–0) || López (3–3) || – || 8,817 || 22–29 || W1
|- style="background:#bfb;"
| 52 || June 3 || @ Rangers || 4–3 || Murfee (1–0) || Barlow (1–1) || Sewald (3) || 25,378 || 23–29 || W2
|- style="background:#fbb;"
| 53 || June 4 || @ Rangers || 2–3 || Otto (4–2) || Gonzales (3–6) || Barlow (10) || 28,794 || 23–30 || L1
|- style="background:#bfb;"
| 54 || June 5 || @ Rangers || 6–5  || D. Castillo (3–0) || Burke (3–1) || Sewald (4) || 27,427 || 24–30 || W1
|- style="background:#bfb;"
| 55 || June 6 || @ Astros || 7–4 || Ray (5–6) || Javier (3–3) || D. Castillo (3) || 27,521 || 25–30 || W2
|- style="background:#fbb;"
| 56 || June 7 || @ Astros || 1–4 || Verlander (7–2) || Flexen (2–7) || Pressly (11) || 30,583 || 25–31 || L1
|- style="background:#bfb;"
| 57 || June 8 || @ Astros || 6–3 || Gilbert (6–2) || Urquidy (5–3) || D. Castillo (4) || 23,752 || 26–31 || W1
|- style="background:#fbb;"
| 58 || June 10 || Red Sox || 3–4 || Diekman (2–0) || Muñoz (1–3) || Houck (1) || 27,314 || 26–32 || L1
|- style="background:#bfb;"
| 59 || June 11 || Red Sox || 7–6 || Sewald (3–1) || Robles (1–2) || – || 37,691 || 27–32 || W1
|- style="background:#fbb;"
| 60 || June 12 || Red Sox || 0–2 || Danish (2–0) || Sewald (3–2) || Houck (2) || 42,900 || 27–33 || L1
|- style="background:#fbb;"
| 61 || June 13 || Twins || 2–3 || Thielbar (2–0) || Flexen (2–8) || Pagán (9) || 12,749 || 27–34 || L2
|- style="background:#bfb;"
| 62 || June 14 || Twins || 5–0 || Gilbert (7–2) || Ryan (5–3) || – || 13,019 || 28–34 || W1
|- style="background:#fbb;"
| 63 || June 15 || Twins || 0–5 || Jax (4–0) || Gonzales (3–7) || – || 15,329 || 28–35 || L1
|- style="background:#fbb;"
| 64 || June 16 || Angels || 1–4 || Ohtani (5–4) || Kirby (1–2) || Iglesias (13) || 21,485 || 28–36 || L2
|- style="background:#bfb;"
| 65 || June 17 || Angels || 8–1 || Ray (6–6) || Lorenzen (6–4) || – || 37,500 || 29–36 || W1
|- style="background:#fbb;"
| 66 || June 18  || Angels || 2–4  || Iglesias (2–4) || D. Castillo (3–1) || Quijada (1) || 24,071 || 29–37 || L1
|- style="background:#fbb;"
| 67 || June 18  || Angels || 0–3 || Herget (2–1) || Milone (0–1) || Bradley (2) || 20,804 || 29–38 || L2
|- style="background:#fbb;"
| 68 || June 19 || Angels || 0–4 || Wantz (1–0) || Gilbert (7–3) || – || 39,052 || 29–39 || L3
|- style=background:#bfb;"
| 69 || June 21 || @ Athletics || 8–2 || Gonzales (4–7) || Kaprielian (0–5) || – || 4,733 || 30–39 || W1
|- style=background:#bfb;"
| 70 || June 22 || @ Athletics || 9–0 || Kirby (2–2) || Blackburn (6–3) || – || 5,414 || 31–39 || W2
|- style=background:#bfb;"
| 71 || June 23 || @ Athletics || 2–1 || D. Castillo (4–1) || Jackson (1–2) || Sewald (5) || 8,215 || 32–39 || W3
|- style=background:#bfb;"
| 72 || June 24 || @ Angels || 4–3 || Flexen (3–8) || Lorenzen (6–5) || Sewald (6) || 35,704 || 33–39 || W4
|- style=background:#bfb;"
| 73 || June 25 || @ Angels || 5–3 || Gilbert (8–3) || Bradley (0–1) || Swanson (1) || 35,466 || 34–39 || W5
|- style=background:#fbb;"
| 74 || June 26 || @ Angels || 1–2 || Suárez (1–2) || Gonzales (4–8) || Ortega (1) || 26,489 || 34–40 || L1
|- style="background:#fbb;"
| 75 || June 27 || Orioles || 2–9 || Wells (6–4) || Kirby (2–3) || Akin (1) || 21,615 || 34–41 || L2
|- style="background:#bfb;"
| 76 || June 28 || Orioles || 2–0 || D. Castillo (5–1) || Pérez (4–1) || Sewald (7) || 16,024 || 35–41 || W1
|- style="background:#bfb;"
| 77 || June 29 || Orioles || 9–3 || Flexen (4–8) || Voth (0–1) || – || 17,412 || 36–41 || W2
|- style="background:#bfb;"
| 78 || June 30 || Athletics || 8–6 || Gilbert (9–3) || Martínez (1–1) || Sewald (8) || 20,860 || 37–41 || W3
|-

|- style="background:#fbb;"
| 79 || July 1 || Athletics || 1–3 || Kaprielian (1–5) || Gonzales (4–9) || Trivino (5) || 27,589 || 37–42 || L1
|- style="background:#bfb;"
| 80 || July 2 || Athletics || 2–1 || D. Castillo (6–1) || Trivino (1–6) || – || 23,907 || 38–42 || W1
|- style="background:#bfb;"
| 81 || July 3 || Athletics || 2–1 || Ray (7–6) || Montas (3–9) || Sewald (9) || 23,333 || 39–42 || W2
|- style="background:#bfb;"
| 82 || July 4 || @ Padres || 8–2 || Flexen (5–8) || Manaea (3–4) || – || 37,913 || 40–42 || W3
|- style="background:#bfb;"
| 83 || July 5 || @ Padres || 6–2 || Gilbert (10–3) || Clevinger (2–1) || – || 29,745 || 41–42 || W4
|- style="background:#bfb;"
| 84 || July 7 || Blue Jays || 8–3 || Gonzales (5–9) || Banda (1–1) || – || 24,998 || 42–42 || W5
|- style="background:#bfb;"
| 85 || July 8 || Blue Jays || 5–2  || Borucki (1–0) || Romo (0–1) || – || 32,398 || 43–42 || W6
|- style="background:#bfb;"
| 86 || July 9 || Blue Jays || 2–1 || Brash (2–3) || Manoah (9–4) || D. Castillo (5) || 41,210 || 44–42 || W7
|- style="background:#bfb;"
| 87 || July 10 || Blue Jays || 6–5 || Festa (1–0) || Cimber (8–3) || Sewald (10) || 37,694 || 45–42 || W8
|- style="background:#bbb;" 
| — || July 12 || @ Nationals || colspan=7| Postponed (rain); Makeup July 13
|- style="background:#bfb;"
| 88 || July 13  || @ Nationals || 6–4 || Flexen (6–8) || Gray (7–6) || Sewald (11) || 16,260 || 46–42 || W9
|- style="background:#bfb;"
| 89 || July 13  || @ Nationals || 2–1 || Milone (1–1) || Fedde (5–7) || Sewald (12) || 19,869 || 47–42 || W10
|- style="background:#bfb;"
| 90 || July 14 || @ Rangers || 6–5 || Festa (2–0) || Santana (3–5) || D. Castillo (6) || 19,243 || 48–42 || W11
|- style="background:#bfb;"
| 91 || July 15 || @ Rangers || 8–3 || Ray (8–6) || Hearn (4–6) || – || 26,494 || 49–42 || W12
|- style="background:#bfb;"
| 92 || July 16 || @ Rangers || 3–2  || D. Castillo (7–1) || Martin (0–5) || Festa (1) || 35,761 || 50–42 || W13
|- style="background:#bfb;"
| 93 || July 17 || @ Rangers || 6–2 || Borucki (2–0) || Otto (4–6) || – || 26,378 || 51–42 || W14
|-style=background:#bbbfff
| – || July 19 || colspan="9"|92nd All-Star Game in Los Angeles, CA
|- style="background:#fbb;" 
| 94 || July 22 || Astros || 2–5 || Urquidy (9–4) || Gonzales (5–10) || Neris (1) || 45,290 || 51–43 || L1
|- style="background:#fbb;"
| 95 || July 23 || Astros || 1–3 || Verlander (13–3) || Gilbert (10–4) || Abreu (1) || 43,197 || 51–44 || L2
|- style="background:#fbb;"
| 96 || July 24 || Astros || 5–8 || Valdez (9–4) || Ray (8–7) || Pressly (20) || 34,827 || 51–45 || L3
|- style="background:#bfb;"
| 97 || July 25 || Rangers || 4–3 || Flexen (7–8) || Otto (4–7) || Swanson (2) || 23,581 || 52–45 || W1
|- style="background:#bfb;"
| 98 || July 26 || Rangers || 5–4 || Swanson (1–0) || Martin (0–6) || – || 25,837 || 53–45 || W2
|- style="background:#bfb;"
| 99 || July 27 || Rangers || 4–2 || Gonzales (6–10) || Gray (7–5) || Festa (2) || 25,509 || 54–45 || W3
|- style="background:#fbb;"
| 100 || July 28 || @ Astros || 2–4 || Montero (4–1) || Muñoz (1–4) || Pressly (21) || 29,799 || 54–46 || L1
|- style="background:#fbb;"
| 101 || July 29 || @ Astros || 1–11 || Verlander (14–3) || Ray (8–8) || – || 38,497 || 54–47 || L2
|- style="background:#bfb;"
| 102 || July 30 || @ Astros || 5–4 || Swanson (2–0) || Pressly (3–3) || Sewald (13) || 37,385 || 55–47 || W1
|- style="background:#fbb;"
| 103 || July 31 || @ Astros || 2–3  || Neris (4–3) || Bernardino (0–1) || – || 35,773 || 55–48 || L1
|-

|- style="background:#fbb;"
| 104 || August 1 || @ Yankees || 2–7 || Germán (1–1) || Gonzales (6–11) || – || 36,731 || 55–49 || L2
|- style="background:#bfb;"
| 105 || August 2 || @ Yankees || 8–6 || Murfee (2–0) || Luetge (3–4) || Muñoz (2) || 38,735 || 56–49 || W1
|- style="background:#bfb;"
| 106 || August 3 || @ Yankees || 7–3 || L. Castillo (5–4) || Cole (9–4) || – || 42,169 || 57–49 || W2
|- style="background:#fbb;"
| 107 || August 5 || Angels || 3–4  || Chavez (2–1) || Sewald (3–3) || Herget (2) || 42,654 || 57–50 || L1
|- style="background:#bfb;"
| 108 || August 6  || Angels || 2–1 || Kirby (3–3) || Barría (1–2) || Swanson (3) || 41,507 || 58–50 || W1
|- style="background:#fbb;"
| 109 || August 6  || Angels || 1–7 || Detmers (4–3) || Flexen (7–9) || – || 27,065 || 58–51 || L1
|- style="background:#bfb;"
| 110 || August 7 || Angels || 6–3 || Gonzales (7–11) || Davidson (1–3) || Sewald (14) || 34,837 || 59–51 || W1
|- style="background:#fbb;"
| 111 || August 8 || Yankees || 4–9 || Taillon (11–2) || Gilbert (10–5) || – || 35,843 || 59–52 || L1
|- style="background:#bfb;"
| 112 || August 9 || Yankees || 1–0  || Brash (3–3) || Loáisiga (1–3) || – || 38,804 || 60–52 || W1
|- style="background:#bfb;"
| 113 || August 10 || Yankees || 4–3 || Murfee (3–0) || Abreu (2–2) || Sewald (15) || 43,280 || 61–52 || W2
|- style="background:#bfb;"
| 114 || August 12 || @ Rangers || 6–2 || Kirby (4–3) || Hearn (5–7) || – || 22,622 || 62–52 || W3
|- style="background:#fbb;"
| 115 || August 13 || @ Rangers || 4–7 || Martin (1–7) || Gonzales (7–12) || Hernández (3) || 31,621 || 62–53 || L1
|- style="background:#fbb;"
| 116 || August 14 || @ Rangers || 3–5 || Sborz (1–0) || Brash (3–4) || Leclerc (1) || 25,560 || 62–54 || L2
|- style="background:#bfb;"
| 117 || August 15 || @ Angels || 6–2 || Muñoz (2–4) || Loup (0–4) || – || 23,096 || 63–54 || W1
|- style="background:#bfb;"
| 118 || August 16 || @ Angels || 8–2 || Ray (9–8) || Suárez (4–5) || – || 20,294 || 64–54 || W2
|- style="background:#bfb;"
| 119 || August 17 || @ Angels || 11–7 || Kirby (5–3) || Toussaint (1–1) || – || 19,550 || 65–54 || W3
|- style="background:#bfb;"
| 120 || August 19 || @ Athletics || 10–2 || Gonzales (8–12) || Irvin (6–11) || – || 16,912 || 66–54 || W4
|- style="background:#fbb;"
| 121 || August 20 || @ Athletics || 3–4  || Jiménez (3–4) || D. Castillo (7–2) || – || 9,626 || 66–55 || L1
|- style="background:#fbb;"
| 122 || August 21 || @ Athletics || 3–5 || Sears (5–0) || L. Castillo (5–5) || Pruitt (1) || 9,314 || 66–56 || L2
|- style="background:#bfb;"
| 123 || August 23 || Nationals || 4–2 || Ray (10–8) || Fedde (5–8) || Sewald (16) || 38,254 || 67–56 || W1
|- style="background:#fbb;"
| 124 || August 24 || Nationals || 1–3 || Finnegan (5–2) || Sewald (3–4) || – || 21,035 || 67–57 || L1
|- style="background:#bfb;"
| 125 || August 25 || Guardians || 3–1 || Gonzales (9–12) || McKenzie (9–10) || Muñoz (3) || 24,028 || 68–57 || W1
|- style="background:#bfb;"
| 126 || August 26 || Guardians || 3–2  || Murfee (4–0) || Clase (2–3) || – || 39,870 || 69–57 || W2
|- style="background:#fbb;"
| 127 || August 27 || Guardians || 3–4 || Plesac (3–11) || Muñoz (2–5) || Clase (30) || 45,586 || 69–58 || L1
|- style="background:#bfb;"
| 128 || August 28 || Guardians || 4–0 || Ray (11–8) || Civale (2–6) || – || 45,190 || 70–58 || W1
|- style="background:#bfb;"
| 129 || August 30 || @ Tigers || 9–3 || Kirby (6–3) || Manning (1–2) || Flexen (1) || 12,536 || 71–58 || W2
|- style="background:#bfb;"
| 130 || August 31 || @ Tigers || 5–3 || Gonzales (10–12) || Lange (4–4) || Sewald (17) || 13,666 || 72–58 || W3
|-

|- style="background:#bfb;"
| 131 || September 1 || @ Tigers || 7–0 || Gilbert (11–5) || Rodríguez (3–4) || – || 14,393 || 73–58 || W4
|- style="background:#bfb;"
| 132 || September 2 || @ Guardians || 6–1 || L. Castillo (6–5) || Morris (0–1) || – || 21,923 || 74–58 || W5
|- style="background:#bfb;"
| 133 || September 3 || @ Guardians || 4–0 || Ray (12–8) || Curry (0–1) || – || 26,254 || 75–58 || W6
|- style="background:#bfb;"
| 134 || September 4 || @ Guardians || 6–3  || Boyd (1–0) || Stephan (4–4) || Flexen (2) || 17,809 || 76–58 || W7
|- style="background:#fbb;"
| 135 || September 5 || White Sox || 2–3 || Lynn (5–5) || Gonzales (10–13) || Hendriks (30) || 37,109 || 76–59 || L1
|- style="background:#bfb;"
| 136 || September 6 || White Sox || 3–0 || Gilbert (12–5) || Cueto (7–7) || Sewald (18) || 17,958 || 77–59 || W1
|- style="background:#fbb;"
| 137 || September 7 || White Sox || 6–9 || Bummer (1–1) || D. Castillo (7–3) || Hendriks (31) || 15,264 || 77–60 || L1
|- style="background:#fbb;"
| 138 || September 9 || Braves || 4–6 || Morton (8–5) || Ray (12–9) || Jansen (33) || 42,114 || 77–61 || L2
|- style="background:#bfb;"
| 139 || September 10 || Braves || 3–1 || Kirby (7–3) || Fried (13–6) || Sewald (19) || 44,965 || 78–61 || W1
|- style="background:#bfb;"
| 140 || September 11 || Braves || 8–7 || Sewald (4–4) || Jansen (5–2) || – || 45,245 || 79–61 || W2
|- style="background:#fbb;"
| 141 || September 13 || Padres || 0–2 || Darvish (14–7) || Gilbert (12–6) || Hader (32) || 34,740 || 79–62 || L1
|- style="background:#bfb;"
| 142 || September 14 || Padres || 6–1 || L. Castillo (7–5) || Clevinger (5–7) || – || 24,238 || 80–62 || W1
|- style="background:#fbb;"
| 143 || September 16 || @ Angels || 7–8 || Lorenzen (7–6) || Ray (12–10) || Tepera (3) || 37,480 || 80–63 || L1
|- style="background:#fbb;"
| 144 || September 17 || @ Angels || 1–2 || Ohtani (13–8) || Kirby (7–4) || Loup (1) || 35,538 || 80–64 || L2
|- style="background:#fbb;"
| 145 || September 18 || @ Angels || 1–5 || Detmers (6–5) || Gonzales (10–14) || – || 24,929 || 80–65 || L3
|- style="background:#bfb;"
| 146 || September 19 || @ Angels || 9–1 || Gilbert (13–5) || Suárez (6–8) || – || 15,594 || 81–65 || W1
|- style="background:#fbb;"
| 147 || September 20 || @ Athletics || 1–4 || Sears (6–2) || L. Castillo (7–6) || Acevedo (3) || 4,251 || 81–66 || L1
|- style="background:#fbb;"
| 148 || September 21 || @ Athletics || 1–2 || Kaprielian (4–9) || Swanson (2–1) || Acevedo (4) || 4,030 || 81–67 || L2
|- style="background:#bfb;"
| 149 || September 22 || @ Athletics || 9–5 || Boyd (2–0) || Snead (1–1) || – || 4,696 || 82–67 || W1
|- style="background:#fbb;"
| 150 || September 23 || @ Royals || 1–5 || Singer (10–4) || Gonzales (10–15) || – || 13,615 || 82–68 || L1
|- style="background:#bfb;"
| 151 || September 24 || @ Royals || 6–5 || Sewald (5–4) || Keller (6–14) || Muñoz (4) || 25,237 || 83–68 || W1
|- style="background:#fbb;"
| 152 || September 25 || @ Royals || 12–13 || Cuas (4–2) || Brash (3–5) || Barlow (24) || 18,350 || 83–69 || L1
|- style="background:#fbb;"
| 153 || September 27 || Rangers || 0–5 || Miller (1–1) || Ray (12–11) || – || 23,221 || 83–70 || L2
|- style="background:#bfb;"
| 154 || September 28 || Rangers || 3–1 || Kirby (8–4) || Pérez (12–7) || Sewald (20) || 21,863 || 84–70 || W1
|- style="background:#bfb;"
| 155 || September 29 || Rangers || 10–9  || Flexen (8–9) || King (1–4) || – || 21,094 || 85–70 || W2
|- style="background:#bfb;"
| 156 || September 30 || Athletics || 2–1 || Brash (4–4) || Acevedo (3–4) || – || 44,754 || 86–70 || W3
|-

|- style="background:#bfb;"
| 157 || October 1 || Athletics || 5–1 || L. Castillo (8–6) || Oller (2–8) || – || 42,512 || 87–70 || W4
|- style="background:#fbb;"
| 158 || October 2 || Athletics || 3–10 || Kaprielian (5–9) || Ray (12–12) || – || 42,465 || 87–71 || L1
|- style="background:#fbb;"
| 159 || October 3 || Tigers || 3–4 || Garcia (2–0) || Kirby (8–5) || Chafin (3) || 23,463 || 87–72 || L2
|- style="background:#bfb;"
| 160 || October 4  || Tigers || 7–6  || Torrens (1–0) || Soto (2–10) || – ||  || 88–72 || W1
|- style="background:#bfb;"
| 161 || October 4  || Tigers || 9–6 || Sheffield (1–0) || Rodríguez (0–4) || D. Castillo (7) || 24,564 || 89–72 || W2
|- style="background:#bfb;"
| 162 || October 5 || Tigers || 5–4 || Swanson (3–2) || Soto (2–11) || – || 22,053 || 90–72 || W3

|- style="text-align:center;"
| Legend:       = Win       = Loss       = PostponementBold = Mariners team member

Postseason

Game Log

|- style="background:#bfb;"
| 1 || October 7 || @ Blue Jays || 4–0 || L. Castillo (1–0) || Manoah (0–1) || – || 47,402 || 1–0 
|- style="background:#bfb;"
| 2 || October 8 || @ Blue Jays || 10–9 || Muñoz (1–0) || Romano (0–1) || Kirby (1) || 47,156 || 2–0 

|- style="background:#fbb;"
| 1 || October 11 || @ Astros || 7–8 || Montero (1–0) || Ray (0–1) || – || 41,125 || 0–1
|- style="background:#fbb;"
| 2 || October 13 || @ Astros || 2–4 || Neris (1–0) || L. Castillo (1–1) || Pressly (1) || 41,774 || 0–2
|- style="background:#fbb;"
| 3 || October 15 || Astros || 0–1  || García (1–0) || Murfee (0–1) || – || 47,690 || 0–3

|- style="text-align:center;"
| Legend:       = Win       = Loss       = PostponementBold = Mariners team member

Postseason rosters

| style="text-align:left" |
Pitchers: 21 Luis Castillo 36 Logan Gilbert 37 Paul Sewald 38 Robbie Ray 47 Matt Brash 48 Matthew Boyd 50 Erik Swanson 56 Penn Murfee 63 Diego Castillo 67 Matthew Festa 68 George Kirby 75 Andrés Muñoz
Catchers: 5 Curt Casali 22 Luis Torrens 29 Cal Raleigh
Infielders: 3 J. P. Crawford 13 Abraham Toro 23 Ty France 25 Dylan Moore 26 Adam Frazier 28 Eugenio Suárez 41 Carlos Santana 
Outfielders: 10 Jarred Kelenic 17 Mitch Haniger 20 Taylor Trammell 44 Julio Rodríguez 
|- valign="top"

| style="text-align:left" |
Pitchers: 21 Luis Castillo 36 Logan Gilbert 37 Paul Sewald 38 Robbie Ray 47 Matt Brash 48 Matthew Boyd 50 Erik Swanson 56 Penn Murfee 63 Diego Castillo 67 Matthew Festa 68 George Kirby 75 Andrés Muñoz
Catchers: 5 Curt Casali 22 Luis Torrens 29 Cal Raleigh
Infielders: 3 J. P. Crawford 13 Abraham Toro 23 Ty France 25 Dylan Moore 26 Adam Frazier 28 Eugenio Suárez 41 Carlos Santana 
Outfielders: 10 Jarred Kelenic 17 Mitch Haniger 20 Taylor Trammell 44 Julio Rodríguez
|- valign="top"

Roster

Statistics
Updated through October 5

Batting
List does not include pitchers. Stats in bold are the team leaders.

Note: G = Games played; AB = At bats; R = Runs; H = Hits; 2B = Doubles; 3B = Triples; HR = Home runs; RBI = Runs batted in; BB = Walks; SO = Strikeouts; SB = Stolen bases; Avg. = Batting average; OBP = On-base percentage; SLG = Slugging percentage; OPS = On Base + Slugging

Pitching
List does not include position players. Stats in bold are the team leaders.

Note: W = Wins; L = Losses; ERA = Earned run average; G = Games pitched; GS = Games started; SV = Saves; IP = Innings pitched; H = Hits allowed; R = Runs allowed; ER = Earned runs allowed; BB = Walks allowed; K = Strikeouts

Farm system

References

External links

2022 Seattle Mariners season at Baseball Reference

Seattle Mariners seasons
Seattle Mariners season
Seattle Mariners